Abraham Lim is an American actor and singer most known for his portrayal of 'Ben Park' on Netflix's Clickbait and as 'Kenji Miyashiro' on Amazon's The Boys.

It was recently announced that Lim will originate the role of 'Jae Ik' on the Broadway opening of the musical KPOP, which will open in Fall, 2022. Additionally, Deadline reported that Lim will star opposite Tom Ellis, Lucy Liu, and Ally Maki in the upcoming Netflix animated series Exploding Kittens, from Mike Judge and Greg Daniels, which will also be the first time the streamer will launch a videogame and a series from the same franchise.

Early life
Lim is a second-generation Korean American. He was born in Queens, New York, and also has lived in San Diego, California. He was a political science and international studies double major who was set to go to law school when he decided to focus on the performing arts instead.

Lim got his initial break on The Glee Project, where he was the 8th contestant eliminated before seguing into traditional film and television. He was the first Asian-American to be cast in the series.

Filmography

Television

Film

Theatre

References

External links

21st-century American male actors
American male actors of Korean descent
American male film actors
American male television actors
Male actors from New York City
Male actors from San Diego
Living people
Year of birth missing (living people)